The Gleaves-class destroyers were a class of 66 destroyers of the United States Navy built 1938–42, designed by Gibbs & Cox. They were the destroyer type that was in production for the US Navy when the United States entered World War II.

The Gleaves class were initially specified as part of a 24-ship  authorized in fiscal years 1938–40; however, Bethlehem Shipbuilding requested that the six ships designed by them use less complex machinery. This temporarily made  the lead ship with more complex machinery, so the class was initially called the Livermore class, and this name persisted through World War II. However, it soon proved possible for Gleaves and Niblack to be built to the Livermore design. Since Gleaves was completed before Livermore and had a lower hull number, the class is more correctly the Gleaves class. Eighteen of these were commissioned in 1940–41. The remaining 48 “repeat Gleaveses” were authorized in 1940–42. These plus the 24  "repeat Bensons" were also known at the time as the Bristol class, after . During World War II the Bensons were usually combined with the Livermores (more correctly the Gleaves class) as the Benson-Livermore class; this persisted in references until at least the 1960s. The classes are now called the Benson-Gleaves class. In some references both classes are combined and called the Benson class. The Benson- and Gleaves-class destroyers were the backbone of the pre-war Neutrality Patrols and brought the action to the enemy by participating in every major naval campaign of the war.

Related classes

See: Benson-class destroyer#Related classes

Design
Loss of one compartment, or even two adjacent compartments, would no longer disable the entire propulsion system. This design was credited with the survival of  after she was torpedoed by the  near Iceland in October 1941, before the US entered the war. The Benson-Gleaves class also introduced quintuple torpedo tube mounts. Their scantlings, or framing dimensions, were increased to carry the weight of the new machinery. This increased the ships' displacement by about seventy tons, to 1630 tons standard displacement. Twenty ships (DD-493–497, 618–628, and 645–648) had square-faced bridges in an attempt to speed production.

Engineering
The main steam turbines were designed and built by Westinghouse.

Armament
The class was completed with four or five  dual purpose guns (anti-surface and anti-aircraft (AA)), controlled by a Mark 37 Gun Fire Control System as in the previous Sims class. The introduction of two centerline quintuple torpedo tube mounts in the Benson-Gleaves class was a significant improvement and was continued in subsequent World War II classes. This allowed a broadside of ten tubes with savings in space and weight compared to previous classes, which had twelve or sixteen tubes and an eight-tube broadside. However, most of the Gleaves class spent most of the war with only five torpedo tubes equipped in favor of greater light anti-aircraft armament. This varied considerably in different ships as the war went on; for example, the specified pair of twin  guns were not widely available until mid-1942 and a quadruple  gun mount and a  gun were temporarily substituted. In 1945 sixteen ships (DD-423, 424, 429–432, 435, 437–440, 443, 497, 623, 624, and 628) were modified for maximum light AA armament as an anti-kamikaze measure, with four 5-inch guns, no torpedo tubes, twelve 40 mm guns in two quad and two twin mounts and four 20 mm guns in two twin mountings. Photographs indicate that, as with most pre-1942 destroyers, the initial anti-submarine armament of two depth charge tracks was augmented with four or six K-gun depth charge throwers in 1941–42 on most ships. In 1943 twelve ships (DD-493, 609, 620, 622, 623, 635, 637–639, and 646–648) were temporarily equipped with three Mousetrap ASW rocket launchers, but this was unsuccessful and the only such installation on post-1930 US destroyers. They were removed beginning in March 1944.

Habitability
Chief petty officers had quarters in the forecastle. All other enlisted sailors had a bunk in large open living compartments astern of the engineering spaces. Beneath each tier of bunks were individual lockers with a wooden grate floor. As seawater entered the compartment during rough weather, the wooden grate was intended to lift the locker contents above the deck and allow the seawater to drain out as it sloshed over the deck when the ship rolled. No laundry was included in the original design, but a single washing machine was later installed in a compartment the size of a closet. Clothing could be washed and spun damp to be hung to dry wherever space allowed.

DMS conversions
Twenty-four Gleaves-class ships were converted to destroyer minesweepers (DMS-19 through DMS-42) in 1944 and 1945. Twelve Atlantic Fleet ships (DD-454–458, 461, 462, 464, 621, 625, 636, and 637) were converted in 1944, with the rest in the Pacific in 1945 (DD-489, 490, 493–496, 618, 627, and 632–635). Magnetic and acoustic minesweeping gear was fitted, with armament reduced to three 5 in guns, no torpedo tubes, two K-guns, four 40 mm guns in two twin mounts, and seven 20 mm guns on the Atlantic ships. The Pacific ships and Hobson had increased light AA armament, with eight 40 mm guns in two quad mounts and six 20 mm guns in two twin and two single mounts. Twelve DMS conversions were the only Benson-Gleaves-class ships retained in service postwar. However, they were judged ineffective in the Korean War due to requiring a large crew compared with purpose-built minesweepers, and were decommissioned in 1954–56.

Service
Twenty-one were in commission when the Japanese attacked Pearl Harbor. A total of sixty-six were built, of which eleven were lost to enemy action during World War II: Gwin, Meredith, Monssen, Bristol, Emmons, Aaron Ward, Duncan, Beatty, Glennon, Corry, and Maddox. Six of these were in the Pacific, two were off Normandy, and three were in the Mediterranean. Ingraham was lost in a collision with an oiler in 1942, and Turner was lost to an internal explosion in 1944.

Most were decommissioned and placed in the Reserve Fleet just following World War II. Twelve DMS conversions remained in commission into the 1950s, the last withdrawn from service in 1956. Hobson was sunk in a collision with the aircraft carrier  in 1952. Baldwin grounded while under tow and was scuttled in 1961 while out of commission, thus is not counted as a loss.

Eleven ships of the class were transferred to foreign navies 1949–1959; two to Greece, four to Turkey, one to Italy, two to Taiwan, and two to Japan.

Modernization was considered in the 1950s but not implemented except on the transferred ships. Those ships not transferred to other countries were mostly sold for scrap in the late 1960s and early 1970s.

Ships in class

Film appearances

See also

List of destroyers of the United States Navy
List of destroyer classes of the United States Navy
List of destroyer-minesweepers
List of ship classes of the Second World War

References

 Destroyerhistory.org: Benson/Gleaves ship list

External links
 Benson- and Gleaves-class destroyers at Destroyer History Foundation
Gleaves-class destroyers at Destroyer History Foundation
 Tin Can Sailors @ Destroyers.org – Gleaves class article 
 Tin Can Sailors @ Destroyers.org – Gleaves class specs 
 USS Gleaves (DD-423) and USS Niblack (DD-424) General Information Book with as-built data at Destroyer History Foundation
 Tin Can Sailors @ destroyers.org – Gleaves class destroyer 
 NavSource Destroyer Photo Index Page

Destroyer classes